The Church of the Holy Archangel Michael (or Kafedral'nyy sobor Arkhistratiga Mikhaila) is a Russian Orthodox cathedral located in Kokshetau (Kokchetav), the capital of Akmola Region in the northern part of Kazakhstan. It is an architectural and cultural landmark of Kokshetau.

The existing structure, built in 1949, is a relocated version of the temple of the same name, previously located in the central city park of Kokshetau and dismantled in 1949. It is dedicated to the Archangel Michael and is located at Valikhanov Street, 68 (formerly Yuzhnaya Street); 020000. The church is built in the Russian architecture style.

It is an architectural monument of local importance.

History

Foundation - late 19th century 

The first wooden church in the name of Saint Archangel Michael was built in 1895 on the territory of the Central City Garden Kokshetau.

The townspeople turned to the bishop Omsk and Semipalatinsk Grigory (Poletaev), who consecrated the church on June 6, 1896. 

The street leading to it became known as Mikhailo-Arkhangelskaya. Parish trusteeship was opened in 1900. 

On Easter week clergy visited all the houses of the parishioners with the holy cross, after that they conducted a tour with holy icons around the houses of the parish.

The revolution and the closure of the temple 
February 2 1918 and the Council of People's Commissars adopted a decree on the separation of the state and the school from the church.

April 5 1923 a - transfer of property in connection with the separation of church from state and school from church. Rector-priest John Maslov.

In April 1923, audits were carried out and inventories were drawn up  St. George and the Archangel Michael churches, the number of icons, candlesticks, bells, vestments were counted. Everything described on receipt was handed over to the priests and church leaders. 
 
Dec. 1937 the authorities attempted to take the Church of Archangel Michael from the community. 

April 6 1939 and at the general meeting of the religious society of the city Kokchetav, it was decided “to transfer the Mikhailovskaya Church to the disposal of the City Council with all church property”.

At an extraordinary meeting of the Presidium of the City Council from April 20 1939, a decision was made to rebuild the temple into a city club. The believers asked the City Executive Committee for permission to hold services in the Church of the Archangel Michael at least until May 10 1939) so that they could put in order  St. George Church, the petition also indicated a request to register the priest Nikolai Vasilyevich Obododovsky for serving in the church.

December 30 1939 and “in order to improve the well-being of the working people of the city”, an estimate for the improvement of the city of Kokchetav was approved for 1940. Number 1 in the estimate indicated "the re-equipment of the church into a city club - 82,600 rubles."

April 10 1940 a - by the decision of the City Council the transfer of the building of the Archangel Michael Church to a club in the department of the martel for a period of 15 years.

From 1940 to 1947, with a stage set up in place of the altar, the Church of the Archangel Michael was a city club.

Return to believers - dismantling and transfer of the church (1947-1949) 

In 1947, the church building, cut from logs, was dismantled and moved to a vacant lot along the current street named after Valikhanov thanks to the intervention of the archbishop Alma-Ata Nikolai (Mogilevsky), who sent a telegram to Moscow to Council for the Russian Orthodox church demanding the return of the temple to the believers.

June 3, 1949, the beginning of the construction of the Church of the Archangel Michael in a new place. On September 12, the building of the Church of the Archangel Michael, erected on a new site by the efforts of the parishioners, was taken into operation. Priest - Matvey Rakov.

In November 1949, consecration of the newly built temple. Despite an attempt by the authorities the following year to terminate the agreement with the community and abolish the parish, the church was not closed. On November 24, Alexander Igumnov was registered as a priest of the Church of the Archangel Michael. February 15, 1950 - agreement on the transfer of the church building to believers.

On May 12, 1950, the church was closed. Priest Maxim Lomakin petitioned the authorities to open the church and resume the services.

On February 7, 1954, the re-election of the church council and the audit commission was held. The rector is Maxim Lomakin.

On June 1, 1956, Joseph (Chernov), previously the head of Kazakhstan Metropolitan District, was appointed the rector of the temple.

From 1973 to 1975, Ambrose Shulgai, appointed by Metropolitan Joseph, served as priest in the church. On January 27, 1975, Archpriest Viktor Golubev was appointed to serve.

On January 2, 1987, the bishop Alma-Ata and Kazakhstan Eusebius (Savvin) appointed Archpriest Vasily Kachankin as rector of the church. In 1989, Archpriest Ambrose Shulgai was reappointed to the staff of the temple by Bishop Eusebius (Savin).

In 2011, St. Michael's Church became Cathedral  Kokshetau and Akmola dioceses.

As of May 2014, the following serve in the Church of the Archangel Michael: the rector of the church, Archpriest Vasily Kachankin, Archpriest Konstantin Kopnin, Priest Alexander Vasilenko, Priest Andrei Savvateev, Deacon Yevgeny Shelobodin.

The parish has a baptismal building, a Sunday school and prosphora building, a brick bell tower, a residential building, and a refectory. Total area 250 sq. m.

Shrines of the Temple 
In the Cathedral of the Holy Archangel Michael there are icons painted on the holy Mount Athos:
 the icon of the Theotokos "Quick to Hear" (written in the late 19th - early 20th centuries);
 the icon of the Mother of God "Axion Estin" (written in 1911);
 the icon of the great martyr and wonderworker Panteleimon (written at the end of the 19th century).

See also

 St George's Church, Kokshetau
 Eastern Orthodoxy in Kazakhstan

References

External links

 Official website 
 Church of the Holy Archangel Michael (Kokshetau) on WikiMapia
 

Buildings and structures in Kokshetau
Kokshetau
Churches in Akmola Region
2020 establishments in Kazakhstan
Churches completed in 2020
Church buildings with domes
Religious buildings and structures in Kokshetau